Duke Huai may refer to these ancient Chinese rulers:

Duke Huai of Jin (died 637 BC)
Duke Huai of Qin (died 425 BC)